The 1916 Nobel Prize in Literature was awarded to the Swedish poet and prose writer Verner von Heidenstam (1859–1940) "in recognition of his significance as the leading representative of a new era in our literature." Heidenstam was the second Swedish Nobel laureate in Literature after Selma Lagerlöf in 1909.

Laureate

Verner von Heidenstam was the leader of the generation of poets of the 1890s that regenerated Swedish poetry. His first collection of poems Vallfart och vandringsår ("Pilgrimage: The Wander Years", 1888), which contains predominantly Oriental themes, marked a new epoch in the modern literature of Sweden. A new form of poetry characterized by rich imagination and the worship of beauty in contrast to the gloomy realistic school which had been dominant in Swedish literature before. In major works such as Hans Alienus (1892) and especially in Dikter ("Poems", 1895) Heidenstam opens perspectives to an inner life. He was later noted for patriotic poetry linked to Swedish history in works such as Ett folk ("One People", 1902) and the prose poems in Karolinerna ("The Charles Men", 1897-98). These were followed by major works such as the epic historical prose work Folkunga Trädet ("The Tree of the Folkungs", 1905-07) including Folke Filbyter and Bjälboarvet ("The BjäIbo Inheritance"). In 1915, the year before Heidenstam was awarded the Nobel Prize in Literature, another aspect of his writing appeared in Nya dikter ("New poems"), a collection of mainly philosophical poems.

Deliberations

Nominations
Heidenstam received his first nomination in 1909 from a Swedish politician and academic, Carl Carlson Bonde. Since then, he was nominated in 11 occasions before eventually being awarded in 1916 with which he received six nominations.

In 1916, the Nobel committee received 47 nominations for 28 individuals, including Romain Rolland (who was awarded the postponed prize for 1915), Georg Brandes, Henry James, Benito Pérez Galdos and Anatole France (awarded in 1921), and for one literary society. 9 of the nominees were nominated first-time, among them Erik Axel Karlfeldt (awarded posthumously in 1931), Per Hallström, Ivan Franko and Gunnar Heiberg. The Pāli Text Society, a text publication society established in 1881, was nominated by its founder Thomas William Rhys Davids. Since 1916, it remains the first and last  literary society nominated for the Nobel Prize in Literature. The controversial German author Elisabeth Förster-Nietzsche was the only woman nominated. The Swedish Academy's permanent secretary Erik Axel Karlfeldt (awarded posthumously in 1931) was nominated by the Swedish bishop Nathan Söderblom.

The authors Sholom Aleichem, Rubén Darío, Richard Harding Davis, Mário de Sá-Carneiro, Jane Dieulafoy, Pierre Duhem, Carolina Freyre, Simon Frug, Olindo Guerrini, Petar Kočić, Jack London, João Simões Lopes Neto, Ernst Mach, Hector Hugh Munro (known as Saki), James Whitcomb Riley, Josiah Royce, Charles Taze Russell, Natsume Sōseki, Modest Ilyich Tchaikovsky, John Todhunter, Petko Todorov, and Francis Warre-Cornish died in 1916 without having been nominated for the prize.

Reactions
The decision to award Heidenstam, himself a member of the awarding institution the Swedish Academy, as the second Swedish Nobel laureate in just seven years was criticized by some. Internationally it was generally well received. The decision to award Heidenstam has been seen as a result of the strong tendency of nationalism in Sweden at the time.

References

1916